Moving Mountains is the second album by The Casket Lottery. The cover and insert images are from Katsushika Hokusai's woodblock prints from his Thirty-six Views of Mount Fuji series.

Track listing 
 "A Dead Dear" - 3:44
 "Rip Van Winkle" - 2:44
 "Vista Point" - 2:37
 "Jealousy On Tap" - 2:51
 "A Thousand Oaks (Away From Home)" - 3:16
 "Ancient Injury" - 3:26
 "Stolen Honda" - 2:54
 "Keep Searching" - 2:52
 "Optimist Honor Roll" - 4:11

Personnel 
 Nathan Ellis (Guitar, Vocals)
 Stacy Hilt (Bass, Vocals)
 Nathan Richardson (Drums)
 Sean Ingram (Vocals on "A Dead Dear")

References

External links 
 Casket Lottery Info

Moving Mountains (album)
The Casket Lottery albums
Albums produced by Ed Rose